Sarian may refer to:
Sarian, Iran, or Sarian-e Olyaa, a village in Razavi Khorasan Province, Iran
Araksi Sarian-Harutunian (1937-2013), Armenian musicologist
Bailey Sarian, American YouTuber
Liz Sarian, French Armenian singer
Zacarias Sarian, Filipino journalist

See also
 Saryan